The CityRail fleet now belongs to:
 Sydney Trains fleet
 NSW TrainLink fleet